HD 1032 (HR 47) is a solitary star in the southern circumpolar constellation Octans. It is faintly visible to the naked eye with an apparent magnitude of 5.77 and is estimated to be 850 light years away from the Solar System based on parallax measure.

HD 1032 is an asymptotic giant branch star with a stellar classification of M0/1 III — intermediate between a M0 and M1 giant star. HD 1032 is slightly metal deficient with an iron abundance 83% that of the Sun.

This is a suspected variable star that fluctuates between magnitudes 5.82 and 5.88 in the Hipparcos passband.

References

M-type giants
Octans
Suspected variables
Asymptotic-giant-branch stars
Octantis, 2
PD-85 00002
001032
001047
0047